Sir Charles Legard, 11th Baronet (2 April 1846 – 6 December 1901) was a Conservative Party politician.

Harris was elected MP for Scarborough in 1874, but was defeated at the next election in 1880.

Legard become the 11th Baronet of Ganton on 12 April 1866, succeeding his brother Darcy Willoughby Legard. On his death in 1901, Algernon Willoughby Legard inherited the title.

During his life, he was also a Deputy Lieutenant and Justice of the Peace.

References

External links
 

1846 births
1901 deaths
Conservative Party (UK) MPs for English constituencies
UK MPs 1874–1880
Deputy Lieutenants
Baronets in the Baronetage of England